The 1894 Pittsburgh College football team was an American football team that represented Pittsburgh Catholic College of the Holy Ghost—now known as Duquesne University—during the 1894 college football season. G. S. Proctor served in his first and only season as the team's head coach.

Schedule

References

Pittsburgh College
Duquesne Dukes football seasons
Pittsburgh College football